, born , (August 19, 1925 – June 23, 2022) was a Japanese film score and television score composer. He worked on various tokusatsu shows and mecha anime.

Personal life
His son, Toshiyuki Watanabe, is a musician and composer, who also has scored films and anime series and his granddaughter Mako Watanabe is part of the idol duo Namakopuri where she goes under the stage name, "Mako Principal".

He died on June 23, 2022, at the age of 96.

Awards
For his work on anime, Watanabe received an Award of Merit at the 8th Tokyo Anime Awards and an Animation Lifetime Achievement Award at the 25th Japan Movie Critics Awards.

References

External Links
 
 

1925 births
2022 deaths
Japanese film score composers
Japanese male film score composers
University of Tokyo alumni
People from Nagoya